The Greenhill television relay station is sited on high ground known as "Greenhill" to the south of the towns of Milford Haven and Pembroke Dock in south Wales. It was originally built in the 1980s as a fill-in relay for UHF analogue television covering the communities of Pwllcrochan, Wallaston Cross, Wallaston Green, Rhoscrowther and Hundleton. It consists of a 45 m self-supporting lattice steel mast standing on a hillside which is itself about 75 m above sea level. The transmissions are beamed broadly south to cover its targets. The Greenhill transmission station is owned and operated by Arqiva.

Greenhill transmitter re-radiates the signal received off-air from Carmel about 45 km to the northeast. When it came, the digital switchover process for Greenhill duplicated the timing at Carmel with the first stage taking place on 26 August 2009 and with the second stage being completed on 23 September 2009. After the switchover process, analogue channels had ceased broadcasting permanently and the Freeview digital TV services were radiated at an ERP of 30 W each.

Channels listed by frequency

Analogue television

1980's - 26 August 2009
Being in Wales, Greenhill transmitted the S4C variant of Channel 4.

Analogue and digital television

26 August 2009 - 23 September 2009
The UK's digital switchover commenced at Carmel (and therefore at Greenhill and all its other relays) on 26 August 2009. Analogue BBC Two Wales on channel 27 was first to close, and ITV Wales was moved from channel 24 to channel 27 for its last month of service. Channel 24 was replaced by the new digital BBC A mux which started up in 64-QAM and at full power (i.e. 30 W).

Digital television

23 September 2009 - present
The remaining analogue TV services were closed down and the digital multiplexes took over on the original analogue channels' frequencies.

References

External links
The Transmission Gallery: Greenhill

Transmitter sites in Wales
Carmel UHF 625-line Transmitter Group